Sir Henry Somer Gullett KCMG CB (26 March 1878 – 13 August 1940) was an Australian journalist, military historian and politician. He was a war correspondent during World War I and co-authored the official history of Australia's involvement in the war. He later served in federal parliament from 1925 to 1940 and held senior ministerial office.

Gullett grew up in country Victoria. He left school at the age of 12 but began a career in journalism through family connections. During World War I he was attached to Australian units on the Western Front and the Sinai and Palestine campaign, and also did work for the War Records Section. He contributed a volume to the Official History of Australia in the War of 1914–1918. Gullett was elected to parliament in 1925 as an "independent Nationalist". He joined S. M. Bruce's government as Minister for Trade and Customs (1928–1929) and then became deputy opposition leader (1929–1931) after the government's defeat. Gullett held a series of senior portfolios in the United Australia Party (UAP) governments of the 1930s, serving as Minister for Trade and Customs (1931–1933), External Affairs (1939–1940), Information (1939–1940), and Scientific and Industrial Research (1940). He was killed in the 1940 Canberra air disaster, along with two cabinet colleagues and the head of the army.

Early life
Gullett was born on 26 March 1878 in Toolamba West or Harston, Victoria. He was the son of Rose Mary and Charles William Gullett; his father was born in London and his mother in Victoria. He left school at the age of 12 following his father's death.

Journalism, literary work and public service
Gullett was encouraged to pursue a career in journalism by his uncle Henry Gullett, who wrote for the Daily Telegraph and The Sydney Morning Herald. He began his career writing on agriculture for the Geelong Advertiser, then in 1900 his uncle invited him to move to Sydney and join the staff of the Herald.

In 1908, Gullett moved to England and became a London correspondent for the Daily Telegraph and The Sun, as well as working as a freelancer. He developed an interest in British immigration to Australia, writing pamphlets and giving lectures for the Australian High Commission. In 1914, he published The Opportunity in Australia, a semi-autobiographical tract designed as "an illustrated, practical handbook on Australian rural life".

World War I
After the outbreak of World War I in 1914, Gullett received accreditation with the British and French militaries as an official war correspondent. He covered the Western Front, where he was "seeing war at close quarters but was not happy to be a mere observer". He briefly served as an ambulance driver, but declined a commission in the Grenadier Guards to return to Australia and enlist in the Australian Imperial Force (AIF). Gullett was recruited as a speaker in enlistment campaigns and for the "Yes" vote in the 1916 Australian conscription referendum. He enlisted as a gunner in the 2nd Division's ammunition column, arriving in England in early 1917, but his age and a bout of pleurisy rendered him unfit for frontline service. Instead, his friend Charles Bean asked him to assist with his archival work. In August 1917 he was commissioned as a temporary lieutenant in the Audit Section of AIF headquarters in France. After seven weeks he was sent to the Australian War Records Section in London, and then in November, at Bean's request, attached to the AIF headquarters in Cairo.

For the remainder of the war, Gullett was attached to various Australian units in the Sinai and Palestine campaign, including the Desert Mounted Corps, No. 1 Squadron AFC, the Imperial Camel Corps, and the Australian Light Horse brigades. He was appointed officer-in-charge of the local branch of the War Records Section in May 1918, then from August was an assistant official correspondent with the AIF. His "status as historian in uniform enabled him to move freely among all ranks", and he developed friendships with Banjo Patterson, Ross Smith and Richard Williams. He was made a Commander of the Order of the Bath (CB) in 1918 for his war-time service.

Post-war career

Gullett was present at the 1919 Paris Peace Conference as a press liaison officer to Prime Minister Billy Hughes. In the same year he co-edited Australia in Palestine, a history of Australia's involvement in the Palestine campaign, and published a pamphlet titled Unguarded Australia in favour of the "populate or perish" attitude towards immigration. In 1923, Gullett's contribution to the Official History of Australia in the War of 1914–1918 was published, a volume of nearly 800 pages covering the AIF in Sinai and Palestine. According to  it was "comparable in scope, if not quite in authority, with the works of Bean on the more popular themes of the Western Front and Gallipoli". Bean himself regarded it as "the most readable and most read" of the official history's twelve volumes.

In 1919, despite his dislike of Hughes, Gullett accepted the prime minister's invitation to become the inaugural director of the proposed Australian War Museum, working out of the Royal Exhibition Building in Melbourne. He resigned the following year to become the director of the Australian Immigration Bureau, but his tenure there was short as he fell out with Hughes over immigration policy. After his resignation he was offered a position on The Times in London, but declined as he preferred to stay in Australia. He instead remained in Melbourne as the news editor of The Herald.

Political career

Early years

Gullett began contemplating a political career towards the end of the war. Letters to his wife record his alignment with the Australian Labor Party (ALP), but concerns that "Labour people at home will be hard to swallow" and that "it will be hard to take sides against many good friends in the AIF who are uncompromising". In November 1918, he wrote:

I should give a fortune to be out on the Labour ticket next elections in Australia. With a good propagandist on their side they will sweep H & Co into the sea. The present administration is a hopeless thing & is not improving.

Gullett's eventual entry into politics came at the 1922 election, where he and his friend John Latham stood as anti-Hughes "Liberal" candidates. His initial attempt to win the Division of Henty was unsuccessful, but he reprised his candidacy at the 1925 election as an "independent Nationalist" and was elected. He allied himself with backbenchers holding similar views and in 1927 attracted attention by referring to Earle Page as "the
most tragic Treasurer Australia had ever had". However, as with Latham, Hughes' successor as prime minister S. M. Bruce secured Gullett's support by inviting him into the ministry. He was appointed Minister for Trade and Customs in November 1928, following the 1928 election, but held office for less than a year before the government's defeat.

Bruce lost his seat at the 1929 election and Latham was elected as the new leader of the Nationalists; Gullett became his deputy. Jack Lang remembered him as "the gad-fly who harassed the Scullin Government incessantly". He was involved in the formation of the United Australia Party (UAP) in 1931, which saw former ALP minister Joseph Lyons succeed Latham as leader of the opposition. Latham in turn became deputy leader of the new party, succeeding Gullett as deputy opposition leader.

Lyons Government

Gullett was re-appointed Minister for Trade and Customs when the Lyons Government took office in January 1932. He lobbied Lyons against including the Country Party in the ministry, predicting "they will prove filthy foes and will stab you all the way from the corner". Later in 1932, Gullett and Stanley Bruce represented Australia at the British Empire Economic Conference in Ottawa, which attempted to establish Imperial Preference, a system of tariff concession within the British Empire. He suffered from poor health on his return and resigned from the ministry in January 1933. In the same month he was made a Knight Commander of the Order of St Michael and St George for his work at the Ottawa Conference.

In October 1934, Gullett was re-appointed to the ministry as a minister without portfolio with responsibility for trade treaties. In early 1935, he presented a draft trade treaty with Japan to cabinet. He travelled to England with his wife later that year to attend the Silver Jubilee of King George V, and to discuss trade with representatives of Britain and the other Dominions. In 1936, Gullett continued his work on the proposed trade deal with Japan, which was tentatively titled the Treaty of Friendship, Commerce and Navigation. However, negotiations broke down and a trade war commenced, with Australia increasing duties on Japanese clothing and artworks and Japan doing likewise on Australian agricultural products. Jay Pierrepont Moffat, the U.S. Consul in Sydney, observed in his diaries that Gullett "looked ill and tired" and was "constantly leaving his desk and taking some medicine at a cupboard in the corner". His health forced a second retirement from the ministry in March 1937. However, Moffat believed that his resignation was actually due to a disagreement on trade policy.

Menzies Government

In April 1939, Gullett became Minister for External Affairs in the first Menzies Ministry and Minister for Information from September 1939.  However, when Robert Menzies formed a coalition with the Country Party in March 1940, he was moved to Vice-President of the Executive Council, and Minister in charge of Scientific and Industrial Research. He was killed in the Canberra air disaster in August 1940.

Personal life
On 2 October 1912, Gullett married Elizabeth Penelope "Penny" Frater, the daughter of the Australian writer Barbara Baynton. The couple had two children together. Their son Jo Gullett also entered politics, serving as the member for Henty from 1946 to 1955. Their daughter, Susan, was the mother of the actress Penne Hackforth-Jones.

Notes

References

Sources

 

1878 births
1940 deaths
Members of the Cabinet of Australia
Australian ministers for Foreign Affairs
Nationalist Party of Australia members of the Parliament of Australia
United Australia Party members of the Parliament of Australia
Members of the Australian House of Representatives for Henty
Members of the Australian House of Representatives
Australian Knights Commander of the Order of St Michael and St George
Australian politicians awarded knighthoods
Victims of aviation accidents or incidents in Australia
Accidental deaths in the Australian Capital Territory
20th-century Australian politicians
Australian military historians
Victims of aviation accidents or incidents in 1940
Australian war correspondents
Journalists from Victoria (Australia)
Australian military personnel of World War I
The Herald (Melbourne) people
Military personnel from Victoria (Australia)
Australian people of English descent